Karaganahalli Subbaraya Ashwathanarayana (25 March 1925 – 18 January 2010) was an Indian veteran actor who appeared in Kannada films He appeared in over 370 films during his five-decade-long career. 
His only memorial in the whole of Karnataka, India is in the Kengeri satellite town, Bengaluru. Memorial name - "K. S. Ashwath Memorial Children's Park".

Early life
Ashwath was born on 25 March 1925 in  Mysore city in the Kingdom of Mysore of British India as Karaganahalli Subbaraya Ashwathanarayana. He completed his primary education from Dalvoy School, Mysore. He then attained the Bachelor of Commerce degree from Maharaja's College, Mysore with seventh rank in the university. His formal education came to an end in 1942 as he joined the Indian freedom struggle. Two years later, he got a job as a Food Inspector. He later became a stenographer in the Deputy Commissioner's office and spent ten years in Government service.

Career
Ashwath's acting began when he started participating in radio plays produced by Mysore All India Radio. His theatre career thus took off and played major roles in plays of A. N. Murthy Rao, Parvathavani and others. Film director K. Subramanyam, who saw him in one of these plays, selected him for a role in Streerathna in 1956, which was Ashwath's debut as a film actor. He was associated with a theatre group shripita .

In 1960, he played the role of a Swami in Kittur Chennamma with B. Saroja Devi in the lead role. In the same year, he played Narada in the hit Bhakta Prahlada. His role in Gali Gopura gave him an edge and helped shape his career as an artiste of immense calibre. Ashwath then got a role in the English film Seven Wonders of the World and even became the first Kannada actor to appear in a colour film.

Several of his films became big hits. His character role in Naagarahaavu as Chamayya meshtru (i.e., Chamayya Teacher) is still remembered and emulated. Another performance in the film Gange Gauri as Narada (the mythological son of Lord Vishnu) is remarkable in the style, rendering in his inimitable style. He accepted the roles of a father to many co-artistes of around his age as long as the character he was playing was strong. In all, he appeared in 370 films, of which 98 came in supportive roles in films with Rajkumar as the lead actor.

Awards
 1993-94 - Dr. Rajkumar Lifetime Achievement Award by the Karnataka Government.
 Honorary Doctorate: Ashwath was conferred an honorary doctorate from the Tumkur University in the year 2008 for his great contribution to the Kannada cinema for five long decades. He was supposedly the first actor to receive a doctorate from the Tumkur University. While receiving the award, Ashwath said he would dedicate this award to all his directors who brought out the actor in him.
 He is the recipient of 3 national awards.

Filmography

 Bhoopathi (2007)
 Saavira Mettilu (2006)
 Sirivantha (2006)
 Karnana Sampatthu (2005)
 Preethisle Beku (2003)
 Kiccha (2003)
 Nata (2002)
 Idu Entha Lokavayya (2002)
 Mutthu (2002)
 Law and Order (2002)
 Entha Lokavaiah (2001)
 Shaapa (2001)
 Anjali Geethanjali (2001)
 Naxalite (2000)
 Nan Hendti Chennagiddale (2000)
 Preethsu Thappenilla (2000)
 Shabdavedhi (2000)
 Dalavayi (1999)
 Prema Geethe (1997)
 Urvashi (1995)
 Indian (1994)
 Kaveri Theeradalli (1994)
 Makkala Sakshi (1994)
 Sammilana (1994)
 Gandhada Gudi Part 2 (1994)
 Odahuttidavaru (1994)
 Musuku (1994)
 Roopayi Raja (1993)
 Navibbaru Namagibbaru (1993)
 Hoovondu Beku Ballige (1993)
 Bhagavan Sri Saibaba (1993)
 Ananda Jyothi (1993)
 Kumkuma Bhagya (1993)
 Gejje Naada (1993)
 Kalyana Rekhe (1993)
 Shrungara Raja (1993)
 Munjaneya Manju (1993)
 Jeevana Sangharsha (1993)
 Urvashi Kalyana (1993)
 Mane Devru (1993)
 Chira Bhandhavya (1993)
 Vasantha Poornima (1993)
 Anuragada Alegalu (1993)
 Mangalya Bandhana (1993)
 Jaga Mecchida Huduga (1993)
 Mannina Doni (1992)
 Mana Mecchida Sose (1992)
 Halli Krishna Delhi Radha (1992)
 Belliyappa Bangarappa (1992)
 Megha Mandara (1992)
 Jeevana Chaitra (1992)
 Kanasina Rani (1992)
 Sapthapadi (1992)
 Rajadhiraja (1992)
 Kranthi Gandhi]] (1992)
 Mathru Bhagya]] (1991)
 Jagadeka Veera (1991)
 Modada Mareyalli (1991)
 Garuda Dhwaja (1991)
 Aralida Hoovugalu]] (1991)
 Hrudaya Haadithu (1991)
 Nigooda Rahasya (1990)
 Halliya Surasuraru]] (1990)
 Muthina Haara (1990)
 Udbhava (1990)
 Mruthyunjaya (1990)
 Aasegobba Meesegobba (1990)
 Yaaru Hone (1989)
 Gajapathi Garvabhanga (1989)
 Abhimana (1989)
 Gagana (1989)
 Singari Bangari (1989)
 Anthintha Gandu Nanalla (1989)
 Sharavegada Saradara (1989)
 Inspector Vikram (1989)
 Rudra (1989)
 Hongkongnalli Agent Amar (1989)
 Daada (1988)
 Mutthaide (1988)
 Mahadasohi Sharana Basava (1988)
 Devatha Manushya (1988)
 Jana Nayaka (1988)
 Samyuktha (1988)
 Bharath (1988)
 Nava Bharatha (1988)
 Shanthi Nivasa (1988)
 Brahma Vishnu Maheshwara (1988)
 Sathyam Shivam Sundaram (1987)
 Shruthi Seridaaga (1987)
 Shubha Milana (1987)
 Agni Kanye (1987)
 Karunamayi (1987)
 Bazar Bheema (1987)
 Aruna Raaga (1986)
 Sundara Swapnagalu (1986)
 Devathe (1986)
 Anuraga Aralithu (1986)
 Hennina Koogu (1986)
 Beegara Pandya (1986)
 Karna (1986)
 Bhagyada Lakshmi Baramma (1986)
 Dhruva Thare (1985)
 Jwalamukhi (1985)
 Giri Baale (1985)
 Lakshmi Kataksha (1985)
 Shwetha Gulabi (1985)
 Guru Jagadguru (1985)
 Bidugadeya Bedi (1985)
 Aaradhane (1984)
 Bilee Gulabi (1984)
 Male Banthu Male (1984)
 Ajnathavasa (1984)
 Runa Mukthalu (1984)
 Ramapurada Ravana (1984)
 Premave Baalina Belaku (1984)
 Shravana Banthu (1984)
 Eradu Rekhegalu (1984)
 Samarpane (1983)
 Makkale Devaru (1983)
 Gayathri Maduve (1983)
 Mududida Tavare Aralithu (1983)
 Ibbani Karagithu (1983)
 Kaamana Billu (1983)
 Benkiya Bale (1983)
 Hasyarathna Ramakrishna (1982)
 Chalisuva Modagalu (1982)
 Nanna Devaru (1982)
 Jimmy Gallu (1982)
 Parajitha (1982)
 Guna Nodi Hennu Kodu (1982)
 Hosa Belaku (1982)
 Baadada Hoo (1982)
 Lakshmi Prasanna (1981)
 Edeyooru Siddalingeshwara (1981)
 Bhagyada Belaku (1981)
 Prema Pallavi (1981)
 Bhagyavantha (1981)
 Snehitara Savaal (1981)
 Bhoomige Banda Bhagavantha (1981)
 Nee Nanna Gellalare (1981)
 Geetha (1981)
 Gaali Maathu (1981)
 Etu Eduretu (1981)
 Chaya (1981)
 Leader Vishwanath (1981)
 Driver Hanumanthu (1980)
 Nyaya Neethi Dharma (1980)
 Janma Janmada Anubandha (1980)
 Vasantha Geetha (1980)
 Nammammana Sose (1980)
 Narada Vijaya (1980)
 Ondu Hennu Aaru Kannu (1980)
 Kappu Kola (1980)
 Haddina Kannu (1980)
 Auto Raja (1980)
 Dhairya Lakshmi (1980)
 Nanna Rosha Nooru Varusha (1980)
 Bhaktha Siriyala (1980)
 Honni Maduve (1979)
 Nentaro Gantu Kallaro (1979)
 Chandanada Gombe (1979)
 Vijay Vikram (1979)
 Putani Agent 123 (1979)
 Muyyi (1979)
 Pakka Kalla (1979)
 Naa Ninna Bidalaare (1979)
 Priya (1979)
 Madhura Sangama (1978)
 Sridevi (1978)
 Amarnath (1978)
 Vasantha Lakshmi (1978)
 Kiladi Jodi (1978)
 Nanna Prayashchittha (1978)
 Sirithanakke Saval (1978)
 Muyyige Muyyi (1978)
 Mythri (1978)
 Maathu Tappada Maga (1978)
 Vamsha Jyothi (1978)
 Havina Hejje (1978)
 Galate Samsara (1977)
 Veera Sindhoora Lakshmana (1977)
 Banashankari (1977)
 Shani Prabhava (1977)
 Shreemanthana Magalu (1977)
 Sose Thanda Sowbhagya (1977)
 Sri Renukadevi Mahathme (1977)
 Badavara Bandhu (1976)
 Kanasu Nanasu (1976)
 Mangalya Bhagya (1976)
 Bangarada Gudi (1976)
 Bayalu Daari (1976)
 Raja Nanna Raja (1976)
 Mugiyada Kathe (1976)
 Besuge (1976)
 Baduku Bangaravayithu (1976)
 Makkala Bhagya (1976)
 Devaru Kotta Vara (1976)
 Aasha Soudha (1975)
 Hennu Samsarada Kannu (1975)
 Mayura (1975)
 Bhagya Jyothi (1975)
 Kaveri (1975)
 Mane Belaku (1975)
 Kasthuri Vijaya (1975)
 Shubhamangala (1975)
 Dari Thappida Maga (1975)
 Devara Gudi (1975)
 Anna Atthige (1974)
 Maga Mommaga (1974)
 Maha Thyaga (1974)
 Upasane (1974)
 Eradu Kanasu (1974)
 Hemareddy Mallamma (1974)
 Bangaarada Panjara (1974)
 Chamundeshwari Mahime (1974)
 Mooruvare Vajragalu (1973)
 Kaanada Kai (1973)
 Doorada Betta (1973)
 Bidugade (1973)
 Sahadharmini (1973)
 Naagarahaavu (1972)
 Mareyada Deepavali (1972)
 Jaga Mecchida Maga (1972)
 Bandhavya (1972)
 Nanda Gokula (1972)
 Naa Mecchida Huduga (1972)
 Hrudaya Sangama (1972)
 Bhale Rani (1972)
 Yaava Janmada Maitri (1972)
 Utthara Dakshina (1972)
 Vishakanye (1972)
 Sipayi Ramu (1972)
 Janma Rahasya (1972)
 Sri Krishna Rukmini Sathyabhama (1971)
 Nyayave Devaru (1971)
 Mukthi (1971)
 Thande Makkalu (1971)
 Bhale Adrushtavo Adrushta (1971)
 Kalyani (1971)
 Thayi Devaru (1971)
 Namma Baduku (1971)
 Anugraha (1971)
 Naguva Hoovu (1971)
 Paapa Punya (1971)
 Sharapanjara (1971)
 Kasturi Nivasa (1971)
 Onde Kula Onde Daiva (1971)
 Sidila Mari (1971)
 Seetha (1970)
 Aaru Mooru Ombhatthu (1970)
 CID Rajanna (1970)
 Namma Mane (1970)
 Mooru Mutthugalu (1970)
 Mruthyu Panjaradalli Goodachari 555 (1970)
 Aparajithe (1970)
 Anireekshitha (1970)
 Arishina Kumkuma (1970)
 Gejje Pooje (1970)
 Mukunda Chandra (1969)
 Manashanthi (1969)
 Ellellu Naane (1969)
 Gruhalakshmi (1969)
 Ade Hrudaya Ade Mamathe (1969)
 Uyyale (1969)
 Bhale Raja (1969)
 Kalpavruksha (1969)
 Bhageerathi (1969)
 Choori Chikkanna (1969)
 Eradu Mukha (1969)
 Kaadina Rahasya (1969)
 Namma Makkalu (1969)
 Madhura Milana (1969)
 Amma (1968)
 Dhoomakethu (1968)
 Namma Ooru (1968)
 Bhagyada Bagilu (1968)
 Mamathe (1968)
 Bangalore Mail (1968)
 Bhagya Devathe (1968)
 Sarvamangala (1968)
 Gandhinagara (1968)
 Jedara Bale (1968)
 Immadi Pulikeshi (1967)
 Dhana Pishachi (1967)
 Sri Purandara Dasaru (1967)
 Manassiddare Marga (1967)
 Muddu Meena (1967)
 Belli Moda (1967)
 Kallu Sakkare (1967)
 Gange Gowri (1967)
 Sathi Sukanya (1967)
 Anuradha (1967)
 Onde Balliya Hoogalu (1967)
 Sandhya Raga (1966)
 Sri Kanyaka Parameshwari Kathe (1966)
 Madhu Malathi (1966)
 Subba Shastry (1966)
 Deva Maanava (1966)
 Premamayi (1966)
 Mahashilpi (1966)
 Mamatheya Bandhana (1966)
 Maduve Madi Nodu (1965)
 Miss Leelavathi (1965)
 Sathi Savithri (1965)
 Bettada Huli (1965)
 Maavana Magalu (1965)
 Mahasathi Anasuya (1965)
 Sathya Harishchandra (1965)
 Sarvajna Murthy (1965)
 Chandrahasa (1965)
 Beratha Jeeva (1965)
 Mane Aliya (1964)
 Pathiye Daiva (1964)
 Chinnada Gombe (1964)
 Prathigne (1964)
 Muriyada Mane (1964)
 Shivagange Mahathme (1964)
 Thumbida Koda (1964)
 Annapoorna (1964)
 Navajeevana (1964)
 Shivarathri Mahathme (1964)
 Mangala Muhurtha (1964)
 Sathi Shakthi (1963)
 Sri Ramanjaneya Yuddha (1963)
 Santha Thukaram (1963)
 Jenu Goodu (1963)
 Bangari (1963)
 Ananda Bhashpa (1963)
 Mana Mecchida Madadi (1963)
 Veera Kesari (1963)
 Kalitharu Henne (1963)
 Kulavadhu (1963)
 Malli Maduve (1963)
 Jeevana Tharanga (1963)
 Gowri (1963)
 Nanda Deepa (1963)
 Thejaswini (1962)
 Vidhi Vilasa (1962)
 Thayi Karalu (1962)
 Karuneye Kutumbada Kannu (1962)
 Swarna Gowri (1962)
 Bhoodaana (1962)
 Gaali Gopura (1962)
 Rathna Manjari (1962)
 Nagarjuna (1961)
 Kaiwara Mahathme (1961)
 Kitturu Chennamma (1961)
 Bhakta Kanakadasa (1960)
 Dashavathara (1960)
 Ranadheera Kanteerava (1960)
 Shivalinga Sakshi (1960)
 Mahishasura Mardini (1959)
 Jagajyothi Basveshwara (1959)
 Manege Banda Mahalakshmi (1959)
 Anna Thangi (1958)
 Bhookailasa (1958)
 Prabhulinga Leele (1957)
 Chinthamani (1957)
 Kokilavani (1956)
 Kacha Devayani (1956)
 Sthree Rathna (1955)
 Shivasharane Nambiyakka (1955)

Death
Ashwath had been suffering from Vertebrobasilar insufficiency. On 11 January 2010 he was admitted to the B. M. Hospital, Mysore following his return from Kashi where he had developed urinary tract infection. His health deteriorated and he subsequently died at 2:15 a.m. on 18 January following a cardiac arrest. He was cremated at the foothills of Chamundi hills in Mysore.

References

External links
 

1925 births
2010 deaths
Male actors in Kannada cinema
Indian male film actors
Kannada male actors
People from Hassan district
20th-century Indian male actors
21st-century Indian male actors
Male actors from Karnataka